The Making of the Mob is an American television docu-series detailing the emergence of organized crime in 20th century America. The series premiered on June 15, 2015, on AMC and is narrated by actor Ray Liotta.

On July 31, 2015, AMC renewed the series for a second season of eight episodes.

Series overview

Episodes

Season 1 (2015)

The Making of the Mob: New York highlights Lucky Luciano and his rise in New York City's American Mafia, as well as Luciano's creation of the Five Families.

Season 2 (2016)

The Making of the Mob: Chicago focuses on the origin of Al Capone and his Chicago Outfit and their expansion into the Midwestern U.S.

References

External links
Episode list at AMC

Lists of American crime drama television series episodes